Epinotia cedricida is a species of moth of the family Tortricidae. It is found in Morocco, Algeria, Lebanon and Turkey. It is an introduced species in Europe, where it has been recorded from south-eastern France, Spain and Austria.

The wingspan is 12–15 mm. Adults are on wing from June to August.

The larvae feed on Cedrus species, including Cedrus atlantica and Cedrus libani.

References

Moths described in 1969
Eucosmini
Moths of Europe